The Bharatiya Janata Party, or simply,  BJP Sikkim (BJP;), 
is the state unit of the Bharatiya Janata Party of the Sikkim. Its head office is situated at Panchsheel, New Market Gangtok-737 101, Sikkim, India. The current president of BJP Sikkim is Shri Dal Bahadur Chauhan.

Lok Sabha Election History

Rajya Sabha Members
There is and was no Rajya Sabha members of BJP from Sikkim

State Election History

See also
Bharatiya Janata Party
National Democratic Alliance
North East Democratic Alliance
Sikkim Krantikari Morcha

References

Bharatiya Janata Party by state or union territory
Political parties in Sikkim